Changing Your World is a television series airing in syndication hosted by Creflo Dollar discussing issues such as family life, physical fitness, and spirituality as well as its impact on your life and the world around you. The show is filmed in College Park, Georgia and has aired since 1990.

External links

1990 American television series debuts
2000s American television series
2010s American television series